Monarchist Party may refer to:

Monarchist Party of Bohemia, Moravia and Silesia, established 1990
Monarchist Party of Russia, established 2012
Monarchist National Party, Italian party established in 1946
People's Monarchist Party (Portugal), established 1974
People's Monarchist Party (Italy), established 1954
Monarchist Party (University of Maryland), student government party

See also
Monarchism
List of monarchist parties